Band of Sisters: American Women at War in Iraq is a 2007 book by Kirsten Holmstedt about the Iraq War and women in the military with a foreword by Tammy Duckworth. Band of Sisters presents twelve stories of American women on the frontlines including America's first female pilot to be shot down and survive, the U.S. military's first black female combat pilot, a 21-year-old turret gunner defending a convoy, two military policewomen in a firefight, and a nurse struggling to save lives.

Holmstedt claims that women need greater protection from hazing and abuse by fellow soldiers, but that they are as strong as men and should be given full combat roles.

Author

Kirsten Holmstedt is a journalist who writes about the military. She has published two other books:
 The Girls Come Marching Home: Stories of Women Warriors Returning from the War in Iraq (2009) Stackpole.  
 Soul Survivors: Stories of Wounded Women Warriors and the Battles They Fight Long After They've Left the War Zone (2016)  Stackpole.

Awards and recognition
 Winner of the 2007 American Authors Association Golden Quill Award
 Winner of the 2007 Military Writers Society of America Founders Award

See also 
 Vernice Armour, featured in Band of Sisters, was the first African-American female naval aviator in the Marine Corps and America's first African American female combat pilot in the United States military
 Tammy Duckworth, wrote the foreword for Band of Sisters. She is a former U.S. Army helicopter pilot whose severe combat wounds cost her both of her legs and damaged her right arm, former director of the Illinois Department of Veterans Affairs, and current United States senator for Illinois

References

External links 
 Women’s Combat Roles Evolving in Iraq, Afghanistan, PBS NewsHour 
 Band of Sisters Official Website
 Barnes & Noble Customer Reviews
 Amazon Customer Reviews
  Band of Sisters: American Women at War in Iraq, limited preview on Google Books

Women in the Iraq War
Women in the United States military
Books about the 2003 invasion of Iraq
Books about women
Works about women in war